Diplomatic relations between Croatia and Italy were established on January 17, 1992 following Croatia's independence from SFR Yugoslavia.

Croatia has an embassy in Rome, general consulates in Milan and Trieste, and consulates in Bari, Florence, Naples, and Padua. Italy has an embassy in Zagreb, general consulate in Rijeka, Vice Consulate in Buje, Pula and Split, as well as Italian Cultural Institute and Foreign Trade Institute in Zagreb.

Both countries are full members of NATO and the European Union.

Population

There are around 19,500 people of Italian descent living in Croatia. There are also around 6,000 Molise Croats in Italy.

In addition, there are around 21,000 registered immigrant Croatian workers in Italy.

Historically, the Dalmatian Italians constituted a significant population of Dalmatia.

Economy
Italy is the most important Croatian foreign trade partner in which Croatia  exports about 14% of its total annual merchandise.

History and relations today
Although stormy at best when parts of Croatia were under direct Italian control during the second world war and Mussolini had a policy of forcible Italianization, followed by Tito's Communist partisans forcing the Italian population out of Istria and the Dalmatian Coast (350,000 Italians forced to leave their native lands after the Yugoslav invasion), today the relations between the two countries might be described as good. Along with sharing a historically strong adherence to the Roman Catholic religion, they have various cultural similarities, with Croatia considered the most "Italian" of all the Slavic countries. Italian is a fairly popular foreign language in Croatia, with 15% of Croatians able to speak it well enough to have a conversation, according to Eurobarometer.

Fishing

A problem arose with the fishing zones in the Adriatic Sea. Italy denied the right of Croatia to proclaim its Ecological and Fisheries Protection Zone before January 1, 2008, because that would have broken an earlier agreement with Italy and Slovenia. At the same time Italy, without breaking the agreement, has proclaimed its own zone.

See also 
 Foreign relations of Croatia
 Foreign relations of Italy
 Italy–Yugoslavia relations

References

External links 
 Croatian Ministry of Foreign Affairs and European Integration: list of bilateral treaties with Italy
  Croatian embassy in Rome (in Croatian and Italian only)
 Italian embassy in Zagreb

 
Italy
Bilateral relations of Italy
1992 establishments in Europe